John Chryssavgis (born 1 April 1958) is an Orthodox Christian theologian who serves as advisor to the Ecumenical Patriarch on environmental issues.  He is a clergyman of the Greek Orthodox Archdiocese of America. In January 2012, he received the title of Archdeacon of the Ecumenical Throne by His All-Holiness Ecumenical Patriarch Bartholomew. In 2016, he was awarded an honorary doctorate by St. Vladimir’s Theological Seminary. In 2020, he was elected Honorary Professor of Theology in the Sydney College of Divinity.

Early life and education
John Chryssavgis was born in Australia in 1958.  He matriculated from the Scots College in Sydney in 1975 and received his degree in Theology from the University of Athens in 1980.  He received a diploma in Byzantine Music from the Greek Conservatory of Music in 1979 and was awarded a research scholarship to St. Vladimir's Theological Seminary in 1982. He completed his doctoral studies in Patristics at the University of Oxford in 1983. Chryssavgis read patristic theology at the University of Oxford.

Career
His work and writing have focused on medieval theology, as well as on the history of the Eastern Church. He holds degrees in theology and sacred music. His teaching has covered wide-ranging topics, such as theological, political, and social developments, themes and personalities of the Middle Ages, including cultural and religious relations and tensions between East and West. His interests have embraced the areas of spirituality, ecology, and liturgy. His research has specialised in the ascetic thought and practice of the early Church, especially from the desert tradition of Egypt (4th century) through the regions of Palestine (5th–6th centuries) and Sinai (7th century). After several months in silent retreat on Mount Athos, he worked with the Greek Orthodox Primate in Australia (1984–1994) and was co-founder of St Andrew's Theological College in Sydney, where he was Sub-Dean and taught Patristics and Church History (1986–1995). He was also Lecturer in the Divinity School (1986–1990) and the School of Studies in Religion (1990–1995) at the University of Sydney. 

In 1995, he moved to Boston, where he was appointed Professor of Theology at Holy Cross School of Theology and directed the Religious Studies Program at Hellenic College until 2002. He established the Environment Office at the same School in 2001. He has also taught as professor of Patristics at the University of Balamand in Lebanon.

In recent years, he has published several books and countless articles in international journals and encyclopaedias in the area of religion and ecology, social justice and peace, with forthcoming books including John Climacus: from the Egyptian Desert to the Sinaite Mountain (Ashgate, UK, Winter 2004); and Light Through Darkness: Insights into Orthodox Spirituality (Orbis Books, Summer 2004)

He currently serves as theological advisor to the Ecumenical Patriarch on environmental issues.

He lives in Maine.

Bibliography
Persons and Events: Historical Moments in the Development of Orthodox Christianity, Archdiocese of Australia, Sydney, 1985. [Out of print]
Fire and Light: Aspects of the Eastern Orthodox Tradition (Light and Life Publications, Minneapolis MN, 1987). [Out of print]Ascent to Heaven: The Theology of the Human Person According to Saint John of the Ladder (Holy Cross Press, Boston MA, 1989) [Out of print].The World My Church (with Sophie Chryssavgis), David Lovell Publishing, Melbourne, 1990. Reprinted with changes by Holy Cross Press, Boston MA, 1998. Five printings to date.  The Desert is Alive: Dimensions of Australian Spirituality, Joint Board of Christian Education, Melbourne, 1990. Second Printing 1993. [Out of print]Repentance and Confession, Holy Cross Press, Boston MA, 1990. Second Printing 1996. Third printing 1998.Love, Sexuality, and Marriage, Holy Cross Press, Boston MA, 1996. Second printing 1998.The Way of the Fathers: Exploring the Mind of the Church Fathers, Analecta Vlatadon, Thessalonika, 1998. [Out of print]Beyond the Shattered Image: Insights into an Orthodox Ecological World View, Light and Life Books, Minneapolis MN, 1999. [Out of print]Soul Mending: The Art of Spiritual Direction, Holy Cross Press, Boston MA, 2000. Second printing 2002.In the Footsteps of Christ: the ascetic teaching of Abba Isaiah of Scetis, SLG Press, Oxford UK, 2001. [With P.R.Penkett]The Body of Christ: A Place of Welcome for People with Disabilities, Light and Life, Minneapolis MN, 2002. Subsequently published by the Greek Orthodox Archdiocese of America: New York NY, 2017.Abba Isaiah of Scetis: The Ascetic Discourses, Cistercian Publications, Kalamazoo MI, 2002. [With P.R.Penkett]In the Heart of the Desert: The Spirituality of the Desert Fathers and Mothers, World Wisdom Books, Bloomington IN, 2003. 2nd revised edition 2008. Also translated into Italian: Bose Publications, Italy 2004. Also translated into Romanian: Sophia Editions, Bucharest, 2004.Cosmic Grace, Humble Prayer: Ecological Vision of Ecumenical Patriarch Bartholomew, Eerdmans Books, Grand Rapids MI, 2003. Revised and updated, 2009. [Out of print]Letters from the Desert: A Selection of the Spiritual Correspondence of Barsanuphius and John, St. Vladimir's Seminary Press, New York NY, 2003. The Way of Tears: A Spirituality of Imperfection, In Greek: Akritas Publications, Athens, 2003.The Way of the Fathers: Exploring the Mind of the Church Fathers, Light and Life Books, Minneapolis MN, 2003Light through Darkness: Insights into Orthodox Spirituality, Orbis Press: Maryknoll; and Darton Longman and Todd: London, 2004 John Climacus: from the Egyptian desert to the Sinaite mountain, Ashgate, London, 2004.The Reflections of Abba Zosimas: Monk of the Palestinian Desert, SLG Press: Oxford, 2004. Reprinted 2006.The Ecumenical Patriarchate: a historical guide, Ecumenical Patriarchate Publications, Constantinople, 2005. 2nd revised edition, 2007. [Out of print]The Correspondence of Barsanuphius and John, with translation, introduction, notes and complete indices (scriptural, patristic, subject and names). For Catholic University Press, Washington DC, 2 volumes, 2006 and 2007.In the World, Yet Not of the World: Social and Global Initiatives of Ecumenical Patriarch Bartholomew, Fordham University Press, New York, 2009.Speaking the Truth in Love: Theological and Spiritual Exhortations of Ecumenical Patriarch Bartholomew, Fordham University Press, New York, 2010.In the Footsteps of St. Paul: An Academic Symposium, Holy Cross Press, Boston MA, 2011. [With Archbishop Demetrios Trakatellis of America]On Earth as in Heaven: Ecological Vision and Initiatives of Ecumenical Patriarch Bartholomew, Fordham University Press, New York, 2012.Remembering and Reclaiming Diakonia: The Diaconate Yesterday and Today (Brookline, MA: Holy Cross Orthodox Press, 2009)The Patriarch of Solidarity: ecological and global concerns of Ecumenical Patriarch Bartholomew, In Greek and English: Istos Books, Istanbul, 2013.Toward an Ecology of Transfiguration: Orthodox Christian Perspectives on Environment, Nature, and Creation, Fordham University Press, New York, 2013. [With Bruce Foltz]Dialogue of Love: Breaking the Silence of Centuries, Fordham University Press, 2014.The Ecumenical Patriarchate Today: Sacred Greek Orthodox Sites of Istanbul, London Editions: Istanbul, 2014.Translation of The Fathers of the Church: Barsanuphius and John, Letters, Volume 2, The Catholic University of America Press, Washington, D.C., 2014.Three Perspectives on the Sacred: The Augustana Distinguished Lectures, Chester Ronning Center, Camrose Alberta, 2015.Saint Anthony the Great, with Marilyn Rouvelas [Illustrated by Isabelle Brent], Wisdom Tales, Bloomington IN, 2015.Primacy in the Church: The Office of Primacy and the Authority of Councils, St. Vladimir’s Press, Yonkers NY, 2016 [2 volumes].Toward the Holy and Great Council: Retrieving a Culture of Conciliarity and Communion, Faith Matters Series, no. 1: Greek Orthodox Archdiocese of America, New York NY, 2016.Translation of Anastasios Yannoulatos, In Africa: Orthodox Witness and Service, Holy Cross Orthodox Press, Brookline MA, 2015 (449 pages).Translation of The Fathers of the Church: Barsanuphius and John, Letters, Volume 1, The Catholic University of America Press, Washington, D.C., 2015.Bartholomew: Apostle and Visionary, Harper Collins, New York NY, 2016. Greek translation: Athens Books, Athens, 2017. French translation: Cerf, Paris, 2017. Ukrainian and Russian translation: Ethos Biblioteka, Kyiv, 2021Translation of Anastasios Yannoulatos, In Albania: Cross and Resurrection, St. Vladimir’s Seminary Press, Yonkers NY, 2016. (378 pages).Theology as Doxology and Dialogue: The Essential Writings of Nikos Nissiotis, with Nikolaos Asproulis (eds), Fortress Academic, Lanham MD, 2019.Creation as Sacrament: Reflections on Ecology and Spirituality, Bloomsbury/T&T Clark, London, 2019.
Coedited (with Nikolaos Asproulis), Priests of Creation: John Zizioulas on Discerning an Ecological Crisis, T&T Clark, London, 2021.
Coedited (with Brandon Gallaher), The Living Christ: The Theological Legacy of Georges Florovsky, T&T Clark, London, 2021.
Coauthored (with Peter Chamberas), The Recognition of Saints in the Orthodox Church, Newfound Publishing, Hebron NH, 2021.
Coedited two volumes on The Holy and Great Council of the Orthodox Church: Orthodox Theology in the Twenty-First Century,'' University of Thessaloniki, Thessaloniki, 2021 [Greek and English].

References

External links
Author Page
Beyond the Shattered Image review by Vincent Rossi
Light Through Darkness: The Orthodox Tradition review by Frederic and Mary Ann Brussat
An Orthodox perspective on hamartology and ecology: Assessing John Chryssavgis' contribution to current discourse review by Dr. Newton Cloete
‘Ecumenical Patriarchate title would elevate Turkey’s reputation’ interview by Cansu Çamlıbel

1958 births
Alumni of Pembroke College, Oxford
National and Kapodistrian University of Athens alumni
Eastern Orthodox theologians
Christianity and environmentalism
Religious action on climate change
Australian Christian theologians
Living people
Sustainability advocates
Academic staff of the University of Sydney
Academic staff of the University of Balamand
The Moscow Times
Traditionalist School